The 2017 NBP President's Cup was the first edition of NBP President's Cup. The tournament was sponsored by National Bank of Pakistan in 2017, as there was no footballing activity in Pakistan since 2016 PFF Cup. The tournament commenced on 17 January and concluded on 26 January.

Khan Research Laboratories won the tournament after defeating WAPDA 1–0 in finals. K-Electric won the third place match after defeating Sui Southern Gas 1–0.

Teams
The 12 teams participating in the tournament are as below:

 K-Electric
 Karachi United
 Karachi Port Trust
 Khan Research Laboratories
 National Bank
 Pakistan Airlines
 Pakistan Navy
 Pakistan Police
 Pakistan Steel
 Sui Southern Gas
 Sui Northern Gas
 WAPDA

Group stage

Group A

Group B

Group C

Group D

Knockout round

Quarter-finals

Semifinals

Third place match

Finals

Bracket

Top scorers

References

External links
 2017 NBP President's Cup FPDC

Football competitions in Pakistan
Pakistan